Lebowakgomo  is the seat of the Lepelle-Nkumpi Local Municipality and was the capital of the former Bantustan of Lebowa. Lebowakgomo lies 45 km southeast of the Limpopo capital of Polokwane. The majority of Lebowakgomo's inhabitants speak SePedi.

History 
The township was established in the early 1970s to become the capital of Lebowa, and was enlarged and developed in the 1980s. The name is derived from two Northern Sotho words Lebowa ("north") and Kgomo ("cow"). The land where Lebowakgomo is located was donated to the former Lebowa Government by Chief Mmutle Mphahlele of the Bakgaga ba gaMphahlele.  The  chief's palace lies 10 km southeast of the township in Seleteng village.

Lebowakgomo was one of the eight townships in the former Bantustan, the seven others being Mahwelereng, Sešego, Mankweng, Lenyenye, Namakgale, Praktiseer, Mašišing and Senwabarwana. Lebowakgomo is also the birthplace of the Great Kamza Mbathero.

Institutions of Education 
In the early 1990s, Lebowakgomo had three primary schools in Zone A (Little Bedfordview, Mogodumo and Ntseekgopu), in Zone F (Dr Dixon Mphahlele) and in Zone B (Eureka), and three high schools: Derek Kobe High School, Lebowakgomo High School, SJ van der Merwe Full Service Technical High School and towards the late 90s Lebowakgomo Commercial(which later became Waterberg FET College), and Mathomomayo High School. Before 2005 two more primary and secondary schools were built in Zone A and Zone S

Notable people 
Notable people from Mphahlele and Lebowakgomo include: 
 Es'kia Mphahlele
 Letlapa Mphahlele (former President of Pan Africanist Congress of Azania)     
 Lilian Ngoyi née Matabane (the first woman elected to the executive committee of the African National Congress), 
 Sefako Makgatho (the second president of the African National Congress),  
 Bokang Montjane (a past Miss South Africa 2010)
 Cedric Phatudi Mphahlele (Chief Minister of Lebowa from 1973 to 1987)
 Stanley Mathabatha (premier of the Limpopo Province, South Africa)
 Lehlogonolo Masoga (Deputy Speaker of the Limpopo Legislature, former ANC Youth League leader)
 Moses Mphahlele former Secretary General of the ANC in Transvaal during the 1920s. Protégé of Sefako Makgatho (publisher of the Sotho portion of the South Africa's national anthem in 1942)
 Arthur Mafokate, musician
Rami Chuene, Actress
Ramahlwe Mphahlele, South African football player
Baroka F.C., Soccer Team
Ngwakwana Asnath Sebati, tennis coach and all round personality.
Tshepo Muroa, Graduate from Stellenbosch University, Former Secretary General of BMFSU 2019–2020, literary and social critic.
Matsimela Calvin Boroto, Web Developer and Graphic Designer, Director and owner of Mohlaloga Boroto Pty ltd.

Shopping Centres
Lebowakgomo has founded three major shopping centres just near Zone B and Zone F. Mall@Lebo was constructed between the year 2013 and 2014 where it first opened its doors in April 2014 and houses over 60 retail stores and major stores. Metropolitan Life Plaza and Mapudi Phasha Shopping complex have both been in existence years prior to the construction of the new mall.

Radio Station
Greater Lebowakgomo Community Radio  (GLFM) is one of two local radio station broadcasting at 89.8 FM, A digital radio station now exists called Connect Radio and broadcasts on www.connectradio.co.za.The radio stations target the communities within Lepelle-Nkumpi Municipality and the youth with content such as news, sports, talk and music.

Neighbouring Communities
The township of Lebowakgomo is surrounded by small to medium-sized villages that in each with their own characteristics contribute the vast majority of day dwellers in its business district. These villages include, Makotse, Ga-Ledwaba home of the Traditional Authority of Ga-Ledwaba, Ga-Rakgoatha, Ga-Mphahlele, Sepanapudi, Ga Masemola and Zebediela home to the Zebediela Citrus Farm which in its prime prior to land redistribution exported citrus to international and local markets and its oranges were famous among locals. Just 13 km out of Lebowakgomo lies the Zion Christian Church former headquarters Podingwane from 1937 to 1942 before moving to Moria.

Facilities of Health
Thabamoopo Hospital is a Psychiatric hospital located in Lebowakgomo Zone A just a few kilometres from Lebowakgomo Hospital, both institutions are public hospitals and offer free services to those that are legible for free services and charge government hospital rates to other citizens. There are other public health facilities and clinics in Lebowakgomo Zone B and Lebowakgomo Zone R. The township has always been dominated by public health facilities and a handful of private health facilities. Over the years there has been a rise in General Practitioners, Psychologists and Gynaecologist all working privately and in recent years there has been a construction of a private hospital (Medleb). It started operating in mid 2018 and has been fully functional.

Sports and Recreation
Lebowakgomo Stadium is a multi use municipal facility which is mostly used to host private functions and recreational events like the annual AKasiDream event hosted every Easter to bring the youth together and a family fun day hosted every spring filled of fun and games for family and children. This multi use facility is capable to administer sporting events such as Soccer, Tennis, Netball, BasketBall and Baseball.
Tennis is very popular with the people of Lebowakgomo. The success of tennis is due to the collective effort of community members who, through their own interest in the sport, taught themselves and then others to play. Tennis has paved a career pathway for many junior players in sports.

References

 "Greater Lebowakgomo Community Radio", 31 July 2014. Accessed 28 September 2018.
 "Mall@Lebo" Accessed 28 September 2018.
 "Traditional Leaders Capricorn District Municipality", Accessed 4 October 2018.

Populated places in the Lepelle-Nkumpi Local Municipality
1970s establishments in South Africa